Gallery of Archduke Leopold Wilhelm in Brussels is a 1651 painting of Archduke Leopold Wilhelm's Italian art collection by the Flemish Baroque painter David Teniers the Younger, now held in Petworth House in England.

The painting shows the Archduke as a collector with friends admiring a set of paintings. The artist himself is showing his patron and Anton Triest, Bishop of Ghent, an example of a Pieta by Carracci. However, the bishop is not looking at the painting, but at his protector the Archduke. In 1651 the bishop held fallen into disfavor in Rome for Jansenism. On the advice of the archduke he read a letter from Rome denouncing Jansenism to his congregation in 1652, but in 1653 he was suspended until he wrote the Pope for forgiveness later that year. The bishop is identifiable from other portraits made at the time:

The paintings are arranged in rows on a rear wall, with several others on the side of the vestibule on the left, and a set that are positioned in the foreground leaning against chairs for inspection.

This painting is one of the first that David Teniers the Younger prepared to document the Archduke's collection before he employed 12 engravers to publish his Theatrum Pictorium, considered the "first illustrated art catalog". He published this book of engravings after the Archduke had moved to Austria and taken his collection with him. It was published in Antwerp in 1659 and again in 1673. Another version of this painting, with the figures arranged differently, is in the collection of the Kunsthistorisches Museum in Vienna.

List of paintings depicted
The following is a list of the recognizable paintings of the collection, not all of which were included in the Italian catalog prepared by Teniers, which was a selection of 243 of the most prized paintings out of a collection of 1300-1400 pieces. Many are still in the Viennese collection. Here is a list of the paintings depicted, which starts with the paintings on the rear wall, running from left to right and from top to bottom. Next listed are the paintings on the left vestibule, and finally the paintings in the foreground propped against chairs:

References 

 David Teniers and the Theatre of Painting, exhibition 19 October 2006 to 21 January 2007 on website of the Courtauld Institute of Art

1650s paintings
17th-century paintings
Paintings in South East England
Paintings in the collection of the Archduke Leopold Wilhelm of Austria
Paintings of art galleries
Paintings by David Teniers the Younger
Dogs in art
Petworth